Vladimir Dimitrovski (born 30 November 1988) is a Macedonian footballer, who currently plays for Iceland second-tier side UMF Grindavík. This young hope started his career in the all-time best Macedonian club, Vardar Skopje and then played for Cementarnica, Westerlo in Belgium and NK Croatia Sesvete. He also played for FK Metalurg Skopje in Macedonia before he signed with his current team and has been the captain of the U-21 national team of Macedonia for three years.

Club career

Early years 
After starting out with the hometown side Vardar Skopje, Dimitrovski's extraordinary talent was noticed by KVC Westerlo in 2006 and he made a switch at still only 17 years of age. He spent the next year and a half season in Westerlo where he further raised his level and became the Macedonian U21 team captain.

He signed with his current team, Mladá Boleslav, on 7 July 2010.

In January 2016, Dimitrovski signed for Czech First League side FK Teplice.

International career
Dimitrovski has been an important part of Macedonia under-21 squad on the last two European U-21 championships.

He made his senior debut for Macedonia in an August 2011 friendly match against Azerbaijan and has earned a total of 4 caps, scoring no goals. His final international was a June 2015 European Championship qualification match against Slovakia.

Career statistics

References

External links
 
 Profile at Macedonian Football 
 Highlights Video 1
 Highlights Video 2
 Highlights Video 3

1988 births
Living people
Footballers from Skopje
Association football central defenders
Macedonian footballers
Macedonian expatriate footballers
North Macedonia under-21 international footballers
North Macedonia international footballers
FK Vardar players
K.V.C. Westerlo players
FK Cementarnica 55 players
NK Croatia Sesvete players
FK Metalurg Skopje players
FK Mladá Boleslav players
FK Rabotnički players
PAE Kerkyra players
Qarabağ FK players
FK Teplice players
Doxa Drama F.C. players
FC Telavi players
Grindavík men's football players
Macedonian First Football League players
Belgian Pro League players
Croatian Football League players
Czech First League players
Super League Greece players
Azerbaijan Premier League players
Football League (Greece) players
Erovnuli Liga players
1. deild karla players
Expatriate footballers in Belgium
Macedonian expatriate sportspeople in Belgium
Expatriate footballers in Croatia
Macedonian expatriate sportspeople in Croatia
Expatriate footballers in the Czech Republic
Macedonian expatriate sportspeople in the Czech Republic
Expatriate footballers in Greece
Macedonian expatriate sportspeople in Greece
Expatriate footballers in Azerbaijan
Macedonian expatriate sportspeople in Azerbaijan
Expatriate footballers in Georgia (country)
Macedonian expatriate sportspeople in Georgia (country)
Expatriate footballers in Iceland
Macedonian expatriate sportspeople in Iceland